Roosevelt R. Davis (born November 29, 1941) is an American former professional football player who played for three years for The New York Giants of the National Football League (NFL). Davis appeared in a total of 22 career games.

References

1941 births
Living people
Players of American football from Jackson, Mississippi
American football defensive ends
Tennessee State Tigers football players
New York Giants players